ArtiosCAD is a software program dedicated to the design of folded packaging, mainly corrugated boxes and folding carton. It is used by box designers, box sample makers, die makers. ArtiosCAD is designed in Ludlow, Massachusetts in a subsidiary of Esko, with headquarters in Gent, Belgium. Worldwide there are about 25,000 copies of ArtiosCAD in professional use. Operating ArtiosCAD is typically a full-time job.

ArtiosCAD formats 
ArtiosCAD uses .ARD as its main native format. A .ARD typically represents one box. It contains a flat representation of the sheet with its cutlines, crease lines and many other production representations. 
Other native formats:
 .A3D: pre-defined 3D representations of packaging, potentially containing assemblies and other combinations of boxes and their contents in 3D
 .MFG: represents manufacturing information.  ARD designs are first stepped/repeated for economical production. This creates a basic representation of the cutting master.  This is then further designed to contain helping aids for production such as:
 Bridges and nicks
 Rubber
 Blanking
 .ACD: ArtiosCAD Canvas. A canvas is a 2-dimensional area on which multiple designs are laid out.  Said multiple parts typically represent parts of a more complex design. One typical use case is the parts of a carton display with e.g. a foot, a back panel and one or more trays. The .ACD file keeps these parts (which would otherwise have been separate .ARD files) together.

ArtiosCAD imports 
ArtiosCAD imports:
 All popular 2D CAD formats, including Solidworks, Designer Workbench, Score!, Vellum...
 Graphics (PDF, EPS, pixel images)
 3D solids from CATIA, Solidworks, Pro/Engineer...

ArtiosCAD exports 
 Cutting table formats
 PDF both 2D and 3D
 PDF with embedded U3D for interactive use.
 All popular 2D CAD formats
 COLLADA for 3D representations with CAD and graphics combined

References

Computer-aided design software